The following railroads operate in the U.S. state of Arizona.

Class I Railroads
 BNSF Railway (BNSF)
 Union Pacific Railroad (UP)

Shortline and Terminal Railroads
 Apache Railway (APA)
 Arizona and California Railroad (ARZC)
 Arizona Central Railroad (AZCR)
 Arizona Eastern Railway (AZER)
 Copper Basin Railway (CBRY)
 Port of Tucson Railroad (POT)
 Kingman Terminal Railroad (KGTR)
 San Manuel Arizona Railroad (SMA)
 San Pedro Valley Railroad (SPVR)

Passenger Railroads
 Amtrak (AMTK): Southwest Chief, Sunset Limited, Texas Eagle
 Valley Metro Rail
 Tempe Streetcar
 Sun Link
 Old Pueblo Trolley

Heritage and Scenic Railroads
 Grand Canyon Railway (GCRY)
 Old Pueblo Trolley
 Verde Canyon Railroad

Industrial Rail Operations
 Camp Navajo Railroad
 Drake Switching Company
 Freeport McMoRan Railroad

Defunct railroads

Private freight carriers

 Apache Lumber Company
 Arizona Lumber and Timber Company
 Cady Lumber Company
 Congress Gold Company
 Coronado Railroad
 Flagstaff Lumber Manufacturing Company
 Helvetia Copper Company
 Kennecott Copper Corporation
 Morenci Industrial Railway
 Saginaw and Manistee Lumber Company
 Six Companies, Inc.
 Southwest Forest Industries
 Southwest Lumber Mills, Inc.
 Tombstone and Southern Railroad

Passenger carriers
 White Mountain Scenic Railroad
 Yuma Valley Railway

Electric
 Douglas Street Railway
 Douglas Traction and Light Company
 Phoenix Railway
 Phoenix Railway of Arizona
 Phoenix Street Railway
 Prescott and Mount Union Railway
 Tucson Rapid Transit Company
 Tucson Street Railway
 Warren Company
 Warren–Bisbee Railway

See also
 Passenger train stations in Arizona

Notes

References
 
 
 
 
 
 
 
 

Arizona
 
 
Railroads